Olímpio Mourão Filho (9 May 1900 – 28 May 1972) was a Brazilian military officer known as the author of the Cohen Plan, a document used to justify the Estado Novo coup in 1937, and, ahead of the 4th Military Region/Infantry Division, as a precipitator of the 1964 coup d'état. He reached the rank of army general and ended his career presiding over the Superior Military Court from 1967 to 1969.

As head of the secret service of the Brazilian Integralist Action, under orders from Plínio Salgado, he wrote the script for a takeover of power by the communists. In the hands of the government, the text was disclosed and falsely attributed to the Communist International as a real insurrection plan, thus justifying the adoption of dictatorial powers by Getúlio Vargas. Accusations of having served to implement the Estado Novo harmed his career and created lasting distrust among other officers, even though he was acquitted in an Army Justification Council in 1955.

He served in the logistics of the Brazilian Expeditionary Force and worked in telecommunications in the government of Juscelino Kubitschek. After defending the inauguration of João Goulart in the Presidency in 1961, in the following years he considered Goulart a threat to the political system and conspired for his overthrow while serving in Santa Maria, Rio Grande do Sul, São Paulo and Juiz de Fora, Minas Gerais. He claimed to have constituted the "greatest conspiracy in the Americas", but his articulations were only one part of the conspiracy activity and other conspirators sought to control him. In Minas Gerais, he had as allies his subordinate, general Carlos Luís Guedes, and governor Magalhães Pinto. He carried out Goulart's deposition when, before the date foreseen by the other conspirators, he moved his 4th Infantry Division from Minas Gerais in Operation Popeye, initiating the coup.

His role in the continuation and victory of the coup was minor. In the resulting military dictatorship, he was sidelined from positions of power by the other coup leaders and relegated to the position of justice of the Superior Military Court. During the dictatorship, he criticized the governments of Castelo Branco and Costa e Silva, having an erratic political position, at first a hard-line and later critical of authoritarianism. In 1979, years after his death, the publication of his memoirs by journalist Hélio Silva created great controversy, as they harshly attacked the other military officers.

Biography

Personal life 
The son of Olímpio Júlio de Oliveira Mourão, deputy and state senator, and Mariana Correia Rebelo Mourão, a full teacher at the Normal School of Diamantina, Mourão Filho attended the Diocesan College of the city until he was expelled. He abandoned the study of engineering in Belo Horizonte to enroll in the Military School of Realengo in Rio de Janeiro, in April 1918. His father, an important situationist politician in Diamantina, helped Juscelino Kubitschek start his political career in the city.

He had two daughters with Almira Linhares Mourão, who died on 6 July 1955. He later married Maria Tavares Bastos. His daughter Laurita Mourão (born 1926) worked at the Ministry of Foreign Affairs and published several books, including Mourão, o General do Pijama Vermelho (2002) about her father. It says he was misunderstood in 1937 (“he was scapegoated and deceived”) and in 1964 (“he was never in favor of closing Congress”). 

His pipe-smoking habit was reflected in the name of Operation Popeye.

Political and military career 
He joined the Brazilian Army on 30 April 1918, at the Military School of Realengo, where he was declared an officer candidate on 18 January 1921. His class was known as the "alfalfa class", the same as Castelo Branco, Costa e Silva, Amaury Kruel, Octacílio Terra Ururahy and Macedo Soares. In 1963 he called it a "little course for the mentally feeble" – everyone, including those who failed, passed to the second period to fill positions made vacant by the Spanish flu, and difficult subjects were withdrawn by Congress – he also noted that it produced a number of Ministers of War, interventors and other illustrious people. By his third year he was ranked eighth out of 98 infantry cadets.

He went to serve in the 14th Battalion of Caçadores, in Florianópolis, where he was promoted to second lieutenant on 11 May 1921 and first lieutenant on 31 October 1922. During this period, he fought the rebels who took over São Paulo in the Revolution of 1924.

The Army struggled to qualify officers, and thus, additional military training was necessary for their career progression. In Rio de Janeiro, Mourão attended the Officer Improvement School, in 1926, and the General Staff School (EEM), in 1928 and 1930, finishing eighth in his class. He then interned at the General Staff of the 1st Military Region. While attending EEM in Rio de Janeiro, he sided with the Liberal Alliance and the 1930 revolutionaries, participating in the conspiracy that launched the 24 October coup in the capital. The resulting military junta sent Mourão to Minas Gerais to advise the state president Olegário Maciel of the transfer of power to Getúlio Vargas.

He was promoted to captain on15 August 1931 and to major on 25 December 1937. Until 1936 his performance was praised by his superiors and even by the Minister of War himself. It was probably during this period that he assumed his political side, dormant in 1924; in 1932 he was again on the side of Vargas, fighting the Constitutionalist Revolution since 19 July in the Paraíba Valley. As a reward, until 1936, he was liaison commissioner between the Ministries of War and Transport on the Central do Brasil Railroad. It was a more civilian position that expanded his contacts in society.

The Cohen Plan and The Estado Novo coup
Mourão Filho was one of the principal leaders of the Ação Integralista Brasileira (AIB) nationalist movement which rose to importance during the period that Getúlio Vargas governed Brasil constitutionally.

According to his autobiography, while running the secret service of the AIB, he wrote a document in 1937 for internal circulation called the Cohen Plan that simulated a communist plot to take power in Brazil. As he was also a captain serving on the army's general staff some copies of these papers ended up in the hands of officials of the Brazilian army.

In the run up to the presidential elections of January 1938 the Cohen Plan was denounced by the government as a plan drawn up by the Communists to seize power. The disclosure of the document added to a climate favourable to the establishment of the Estado Novo dictatorship and the banning of all political parties (including the AIB) on 10 November 1937.

On 11 May 1938 a few people, including integralistas, violently invaded the Guanabara Palace (seat of the federal government) in an attempt to overthrow president Getúlio Vargas. Following this episode, known as the integralist conspiracy, the leaders of the extinct AIB, Mourão among them, were arrested and charged. They were later pardoned by Vargas on condition of loyalty to the leader of the Estado Novo.

1964 Coup d'état
Mourão Filho had a decisive role in the military coup of 1964. On the morning of 31 March, Mourão made telephone calls throughout Brazil saying, "My troops are on the street". On the evening of the same day he ordered the troops under his commanded in Juiz de Fora to occupy the state of Guanabara, now the city of Rio de Janeiro. These forces were reinforced by two other regiments coming from Belo Horizonte and São João del Rei. They met no resistance and ended up fraternizing halfway with elements of the First Army who had left Rio de Janeiro with the mission of confronting them. The operation was called "Operation Popeye", in reference to Mourão Filho's habitual pipe smoking. His action was criticized by his allies, among them Magalhaes Pinto, then governor of Minas Gerais and civil leader of the coup, who said: "...moving troops with few weapons and resources in haste from Juiz de Fora to Rio de Janeiro Mourão could have caused a bloodbath".

According to some conservative political publications, Mourão Filho participated in political meetings in the cathedral square in São Paulo, and his diary contained notes about the "rights that every government should promote".

Superior Tribunal Militar
Mourão Filho became a minister of the supreme military court on 9 September 1964 and was president of the Court from 17 March 1967 to 17 March 1969.

References

Citations

Bibliography
Books
 
 
 
 
 
 
 
 
 
 
 
 
 

Articles and academic works
 
 
 
 
 
 
 
 
 
 
 
 
 
 
 

Other
 

1900 births
1972 deaths
Brazilian generals
People from Minas Gerais
Antisemitism in Brazil